Alick Denholm John Black (5 March 1909 – 25 March 1988) was an Australian rules footballer who played for the South Melbourne Football Club in the Victorian Football League (VFL).

Notes

External links 

1909 births
1988 deaths
Australian rules footballers from Victoria (Australia)
Sydney Swans players